Actebia is a genus of moths of the family Noctuidae.

Species
 Actebia fennica (Tauscher, 1806) – Eversmann's rustic, black army cutworm
 Actebia praecox (Linnaeus, 1758) – Portland moth
Subgenus Protexarnis
 Actebia balanitis (Grote, 1873)
 Actebia squalida (Guenée, 1852)
 Actebia opisoleuca (Staudinger, 1881)

References
 Actebia at Markku Savela's Lepidoptera and some other life forms
Protexarnis at funet
 Natural History Museum Lepidoptera genus database

Noctuinae
Noctuoidea genera